There has been continuous provision of rail transport in Benin since 1906. Railway stations in Benin include:

Maps 
 UN Map Benin

Operational 

 Cotonou - (0 km) port
 Porto Novo - national capital; cement factory
 Bohicon 
 Dassa-Zoume
 Savé
 Parakou - (438 km) railhead in north

Non operational 

 Pobé - branch railhead in east
 Ouidah - on line to west
 Segboroué - branch railhead in west.

Under construction 
 (2015) 
  Parakou (438 km) - railhead in north
  Ndali 
  Kandi
  Guéné
  Lama-Kara
   border (574 km) 
  Gaya
  Dosso
  Kollo
  Say - iron ore with 650Mt of reserves.
  Niamey (1000 km)

Proposed 
 Cadjehoun St Jean
 Godomey
 Cococodji
 Pahou - terminus of suburban passenger service 
 Sémé 
 Porto Novo
 Cotonou - terminus of suburban passenger service

Closed 
 Abomey - junction on former  Zagnanado narrow gauge line
 Zagnanado - branch terminus on former Zagnanado narrow gauge line
 Hévé - branch terminus on former Mono narrow gauge line (station intact, but line lifted)
 Comè - intermediate stop on former Mono narrow gauge line
 Adjaha - intermediate stop on former Mono narrow gauge line

See also 
 AfricaRail
 Railway stations in Niger
 Railway stations in Togo
 Transport in Benin

References

External links 
 UNHCR Map of Benin
 CIA Map of Benin

 
Railway stations
Railway stations